Zainab Kapanda (born 12 March 2002) is a Malawian footballer who plays as a midfielder for Blantyre Zero and the Malawi women's national team.

Club career
Kapanda has played for Blantyre Zero in Malawi.

International career
Kapanda capped for Malawi at senior level during two COSAFA Women's Championship editions (2020 and 2021).

References

External links

2002 births
Living people
People from Blantyre
Malawian women's footballers
Women's association football midfielders
Malawi women's international footballers